The 2014–15 Loyola Ramblers men's basketball team represented Loyola University Chicago during the 2014–15 NCAA Division I men's basketball season. The Ramblers, led by fourth year head coach Porter Moser, played their home games at the Joseph J. Gentile Arena and were members of the Missouri Valley Conference. They finished the season 24–13, 8–10 in MVC play to finish in sixth place. They advanced to the semifinals of the Missouri Valley tournament where they lost to Northern Iowa. They were invited to the College Basketball Invitational where they defeated Rider, Oral Roberts, and Seattle to advance to the best-of-three finals series against Louisiana–Monroe. They defeated Louisiana–Monroe 2 games to 0 to become the CBI champions.

Previous season
The Loyola finished the season 10–22, 4–14 in MVC play to finish in last place. They advanced to the quarterfinals of the Missouri Valley tournament where they lost to Indiana State.

Roster

Schedule

|-
!colspan=9 style="background:#800000; color:#D4AF37;"| Regular season

|-
!colspan=12 style="background:#800000; color:#D4AF37"| Missouri Valley Conference regular season

|-
!colspan=9 style="background:#800000; color:#D4AF37;"| Missouri Valley tournament

|-
!colspan=9 style="background:#800000; color:#D4AF37;"| College Basketball Invitational

References

Loyola Ramblers men's basketball seasons
Loyola
Loyola
College Basketball Invitational championship seasons
Loyola Ramblers
Loyola Ramblers